The Taft Farmstead is a historic farm located west of Rochester, Sangamon County, Illinois. Established in the early 20th century, the farm is one of the few intact farmsteads from the period which was not a renovation of an earlier farm. The farm's Classical Revival farmhouse, which dates from 1912, is representative of the spread of individualized architecture to farms; its design includes two-story Doric columns along the front porch and a pyramidal roof with a pediment-like dormer in front. The farm's main barn, a wooden structure used for livestock, was built in 1906. The farm also includes two additional barns, a grain shed, a chicken coop, an outhouse, and a garage.

The farm was added to the National Register of Historic Places on November 20, 1980.

References

Farms on the National Register of Historic Places in Illinois
Neoclassical architecture in Illinois
Buildings and structures completed in 1906
Houses completed in 1912
National Register of Historic Places in Sangamon County, Illinois
1906 establishments in Illinois